Choghamish (also Romanized as Choghāmīsh and Choghā Mīsh; also known as Choghā Mīsheh-ye Dowlatī and Shahrak-e Choghā Mīsh) is a city & capital of Choghamish District, Choghamish Rural District, Dezful County, Khuzestan Province, Iran. At the 2006 census, its population was 1,967, in 380 families.

References 

Populated places in Dezful County
Cities in Khuzestan Province